I Go Out and You Stay Here is a 1931 German comedy film directed by Hans Behrendt and starring Camilla Horn, Berthe Ostyn, and Hermine Sterler. A separate French-language film was also produced.

The film's sets were designed by the art director Willi Herrmann and Herbert O. Phillips.

Cast
Camilla Horn as Gaby, Mannequin
Berthe Ostyn as Christa, Mannequin
Hermine Sterler as Stephanie Derlett, Inhaberin eines Modesalons
Hans Brausewetter as Georg, Fahrlehrer
Fritz Ley as Walter, Bankbeamter
Theodor Loos as Konstantin von Haller
Oskar Sima as Maximilian von Wachmeister
Margo Lion as Maria, Maximilians Frau
Peter Wolff as Kadi, der 15jährige Sohn
Max Gülstorff as Diener Tottleben

References

External links

1931 comedy films
German comedy films
Films of the Weimar Republic
Films directed by Hans Behrendt
German multilingual films
Universal Pictures films
German black-and-white films
1931 multilingual films
1930s German films